Carlo Miranda (15 August 1912 – 28 May 1982) was an Italian mathematician, working on mathematical analysis, theory of elliptic partial differential equations and complex analysis: he is known for giving the first proof of the Poincaré–Miranda theorem, for Miranda's theorem in complex analysis, and for writing an influential monograph in the theory of elliptic partial differential equations.

Selected works

Scientific works

Articles
, available at Gallica.
, available at NUMDAM.
.

Books
. 
.
.
. 
: two volumes collecting his most important mathematical papers in their original language and typographical form, and a full list of Miranda's publications.

Commemorative, historical, and survey works
.
.
.

See also
Luigi Amerio
Schottky's theorem
Singular integral

Notes

References

Biographical references

. The "Yearbook" of the renowned Italian scientific institution, including an historical sketch of its history, the list of all past and present members as well as a wealth of informations about its academic and scientific activities.
. The "Yearbook 2015" of the Accademia Pontaniana, published by the Academy itself and describing its past and present hierarchies and its activities. It also gives some notes on its history, the full list of its members and other useful information.

.
. An almost identical transcription of the commemoration , published on the journal of the Academia for the wish of Givanni Battista Marini Bettolo to honor Carlo Miranda for his important work for the journal itself.
. The "Yearbook 2014" of the Società Nazionale di Scienze Lettere e Arti in Napoli, published by the society itself and describing its past and present hierarchies, and its activities. It also reports some notes on its history, the full list of its members and other useful information.

General references
: includes a list of Miranda's publications.
.
.
: includes a list of Miranda's publications.
.

Scientific references
.
: includes a list of Miranda's publications.
.
. An ample survey paper on results on the solutions of linear integral and partial differential equation obtained by the research team of Mauro Picone at the Istituto Nazionale per le Applicazioni del Calcolo, by using methods from functional analysis. 
.
. The "Introduction" to his "Selected works" by the members of the UMI scientific commission who edited them.

Publications dedicated to his memory

External links

1912 births
1982 deaths
Complex analysts
20th-century Italian mathematicians
University of Naples Federico II alumni
Academic staff of the University of Genoa
Academic staff of the Polytechnic University of Turin
Academic staff of the University of Naples Federico II
Members of the Lincean Academy
Mathematical analysts
PDE theorists
Giornale di matematiche editors